The Canon EOS C300 Mark II is Canon's update to its first generation cinema camera, the Canon C300, and is part of the Canon Cinema EOS line. Notable new features compared to the previous model are the implementation of a sensor capable of a 15-stops of dynamic range, 4K XFAVC and 12-bit internal recording, color matrices, and the ability to record raw motion video via external recorder.

Sample footage
Canon sponsored the production of "Trick Shot", the first short film to make use of the Canon C300 Mark II, directed by Evan Kaufmann.

Specifications
8.85mp 4206x2340 Super-35 CMOS sensor (QFHD resolution)
Dual-DIGIC DV5 Processor
Canon XF-AVC Codec
Dual CFast Card Slots
Peak ASA of 102,400
Dual Pixel Autofocus with Face Detection
10-bit Canon Log 2 Gamma available (including previous Canon Log gamma)
Uses BP-A30 batteries
Sold as a system, including LCD monitor / XLR audio unit, side grip, and top handle.
Availability: Sept. 2015
Price: appx. US$16,000 (original), $7,499 (current)

References

Canon EOS cameras
Digital movie cameras